Hans Reinowski  (January 28, 1900 in Bernburg – January 3, 1977 in Darmstadt), was a German journalist, writer and politician, representative of the Social Democratic Party. He was the author of the brochure "Terror in Braunschweig", published in Zürich in 1933.

See also
List of Social Democratic Party of Germany politicians

References

1900 births
1977 deaths
People from Bernburg
People from the Duchy of Anhalt
Social Democratic Party of Germany politicians
Knights Commander of the Order of Merit of the Federal Republic of Germany
20th-century German journalists